Charles Atkins was a 15-year-old African-American boy who was lynched in Davisboro, Washington County, Georgia by a mob on May 18, 1922. According to the United States Senate Committee on the Judiciary it was the 25th of 61 lynchings during 1922 in the United States.

Background
Mrs. Elizabeth "Billy" Kitchens, 20, served as a rural mail carrier. While driving her car,  from Davisboro, someone pushed their way into her vehicle, placed a shotgun against her head and fired, killing her instantly. A local farmer, Sid Lewis, found the body 30 minutes after the shooting and informed Sheriff English at Sandersville, Georgia.

Lynching
A mob made up of 2,000 people found Charles Atkins in Elizabeth Kitchens's car. Around 6:00 PM, May 18, 1922, he was tortured with fire until he confessed to allegedly killing Elizabeth Kitchens for her automobile. He then implicated another boy, John Henry Tarver. Atkins was then hanged and his charred body was shot over 200 times. Hundreds of cars then swarmed the county looking for Tarver and another Black person, George Clark, who had been seen with Tarver.

Bibliography 
Notes
 
 

1922 riots
1922 in Georgia (U.S. state)
African-American history of Georgia (U.S. state)
Deaths by person in Georgia (U.S. state)
December 1922 events
Lynching deaths in Georgia (U.S. state)
Protest-related deaths
Racially motivated violence against African Americans
Riots and civil disorder in Georgia (U.S. state)
White American riots in the United States
Washington County, Georgia